Pseudoceros susanae is a marine flatworm species that belongs to the Pseudocerotidae family.

Description 
Pseudoceros susanae can reach a length of 35–55 mm. It has an enlarged oval shape. The upper surface of the body is orange-red, with a thin middle yellow line and two marginal bluish and violet bands.

Distribution 
This species can be found in the Indian Ocean and Maldives at a depth of about 15 m.

Bibliography 
 A new species and new records of Pseudoceros (Turbellaria, Polycladida) from the Maldives. Journal of South Asian Natural History, 2(2), March 1997: 247-255. [Zoological Record Volume 134]

References

External links 
 Nudipixel
 Organism Names
 Encyclopedia of Life
  Discover Life
 Nudibranch
 Turbellarian Taxonomic Database
 

Turbellaria
Animals described in 1997